The 1971 Greenlandic Football Championship was the inaugural edition of the Greenlandic Football Championship. The final round was held in Nuuk. It was won by Tupilak-41 who defeated Grønlands Seminarius Sportklub 1–0 in the final.

Final standings

See also
Football in Greenland
Football Association of Greenland
Greenland national football team
Greenlandic Football Championship

References

Greenlandic Men's Football Championship seasons
Green
Green
Foot